Akçalı is a village in the Çanakkale District of Çanakkale Province in Turkey. Its population is 51 (2021).

References

Villages in Çanakkale District